Sir Donald Henry Farquharson PC DL (26 February 1928 – 21 August 2011) was a British judge, who served as a High Court Judge for eight years and as a judge of the Court of Appeal for six years.

Life

Farquharson was educated at the Royal Commercial Travellers School before studying at Keble College, Oxford. He was called to the bar as a member of Inner Temple in 1952 and thereafter practised as a barrister. He was appointed Deputy Chairman of the Essex Quarter Sessions in 1970, and took silk in 1972.  He was a Recorder of the Crown Court from 1972 until 1981, when he was appointed as a judge of the High Court of Justice, assigned to the Queen's Bench Division.

He received the customary knighthood upon appointment. In 1989, he was promoted to become a Lord Justice of Appeal as a member of the Court of Appeal, and became a member of the Privy Council. He was made an Honorary Fellow of Keble College in the same year.

He was chairman of the Judicial Studies Board from 1992 to 1994. Farquharson retired from the bench in 1995.

References

External links
Obituary of Sir Donald Farquharson, The daily Telegraph, 8 September 2011

1928 births
2011 deaths
British barristers
Queen's Bench Division judges
Lords Justices of Appeal
Alumni of Keble College, Oxford
Members of the Inner Temple
Knights Bachelor
Members of the Privy Council of the United Kingdom
20th-century King's Counsel
Deputy Lieutenants of Essex
Place of birth missing
20th-century English judges